The Ormskirk by-election of 12 November 1953 was held after the elevation to the Peerage of Conservative MP Arthur Salter.

The seat was safe, having been won at the 1951 United Kingdom general election by almost 14,000 votes

Result of the previous general election

Result of the by-election

References

1953 elections in the United Kingdom
1953 in England
1950s in Lancashire
Ormskirk
By-election, 1953
By-elections to the Parliament of the United Kingdom in Lancashire constituencies